Jessica Rose Paetsch (born January 31, 1993 in Denver, Colorado) is an American pair skater. With former partner Jon Nuss, she is the 2008 U.S. Junior Champion and a two-time bronze medalist at the Junior Grand Prix Final.

Career 
Paetsch first tried to compete with Brady Miller. She teamed up with Jon Nuss in May 2005. Paetsch & Nuss are the 2006 US National novice champions and 2007 national junior bronze medalists. They won the bronze medal at the 2006 Junior Grand Prix Final.

Although they placed fourth on the day, they were later awarded the bronze medal from the 2007–2008 Junior Grand Prix Final following the retroactive disqualification of first-place-finishers Vera Bazarova and Yuri Larionov due to a positive doping sample from Larionov. This bronze medal guaranteed Paetsch & Nuss a spot on the 2008–2009 Grand Prix of Figure Skating. They were assigned to the 2008 Skate Canada International Grand Prix competition.

Paetsch and Nuss announced the end of their partnership on July 14, 2008. Paetsch teamed up to compete with Drew Meekins. They placed 10th at the 2009 U.S. Figure Skating Championships.

After qualifying for the 2010 U.S. Figure Skating Championships, Paetsch and Meekins announced the end of their partnership in December 2009.

Programs

Competitive highlights
(with Meekins)

(with Nuss)

References

External links 
 

American female pair skaters
Living people
1993 births
21st-century American women
20th-century American women